Yanis Lhéry (born 7 May 2003) is a French professional footballer who plays as a forward for  club Saint-Étienne.

Club career 
Lhéry made his professional debut for Saint-Étienne on 23 May 2021 in a match against Dijon.

References

External links

2003 births
Living people
People from Tremblay-en-France
French footballers
French people of Guadeloupean descent
Black French sportspeople
France youth international footballers
Association football forwards
AS Saint-Étienne players
Ligue 1 players
Championnat National 3 players